MusicBrainz Picard is a free and open-source software application for identifying, tagging, and organising digital audio recordings. It was developed by the MetaBrainz Foundation, a non-profit company that also operates the MusicBrainz database.

Picard identifies audio files and Compact Discs by comparing either their metadata or their acoustic fingerprints with records in the database. Audio file metadata (or "tags") are a means for storing information about a recording in the file. When Picard identifies an audio file, it can add new information to it, such as the recording artist, the album title, the record label, and the date of release. In some cases, it can also add more detailed information, such as lists of performers and their instruments. The source of this information is the MusicBrainz database, which is curated by volunteers. The more information the database has about a recording, the more Picard can embed in users' audio files.

MusicBrainz Picard has tag editing features, and is extensible with plug-ins. It is named for Captain Jean-Luc Picard, a character in the US television series Star Trek: The Next Generation.

Development

Picard began as a tag editor called the MusicBrainz Tagger, which was the work of MusicBrainz founder Robert Kaye and other volunteers. It was developed in the Python programming language, and ran only on Microsoft Windows operating systems.

This early incarnation of the program could identify songs based on tags or MusicDNS acoustic fingerprints. However, Kaye saw that it needed cosmetic and functional improvements. Streaming media company RealNetworks took an interest in MusicBrainz, and gave the developers a grant to improve the Tagger software.

As a sponsor of the development project, RealNetworks asked Kaye to come up with a project code name. Since Kaye was trying to make a "next-generation tagger", he thought of the science fiction television series Star Trek: The Next Generation, in which Patrick Stewart plays the role of Captain Jean-Luc Picard. Although Kaye intended the name Picard to be temporary, MusicBrainz Picard remains the official name of the program.

With funding from RealNetworks, MusicBrainz developers designed a new user interface for Picard. When the new software identified tracks, it grouped them by album in a collapsible tree view. The developers also switched from a software library called wxPython to another called PyQt, and ported Picard to the operating systems Linux and macOS.

In 2009, Picard's developers replaced the MusicDNS acoustic fingerprinting system with AcoustID.

In 2017, Picard's development version was made available on PyPi, supporting Windows, Linux and macOS.

In 2018, Picard 2.0 was released with support for Python 3, PyQt5 and a new and improved UI.

Supported file formats
Picard supports these audio file formats:

References

External links

 
 MusicBrainz Picard entries in the MusicBrainz Blog

Online music database clients
Picard
Acoustic fingerprinting
Tag editors
Multimedia software for Linux
Windows multimedia software
MacOS multimedia software
Free software programmed in Python
Audio software that uses Qt